Resolis (from the Scottish Gaelic Ruigh Sholais meaning Bright Slope) is a village and parish on the B9163 road, in the Black Isle in Scotland. It is part of the Presbytery of Ross. In 2011 it had a population of 362.

At the 2011 census, the population of the civil parish was 911.
The area of the parish is 12,472 acres. Resolis parish is also a community council area.

Notable People

Rev Hector Cameron born and raised here.

References 

Villages in Highland (council area)
Parishes in Ross and Cromarty
Black Isle